Tal Rosenzweig (born 1967), known as Tal R, is a Danish artist based in Copenhagen.

Life and work
Tal R was born in Israel and moved to Denmark with his family when he was one year old. He studied at Billedskolen, Copenhagen, from 1986 to 1988 and at the Royal Danish Academy of Fine Arts from 1994 to 2000.

Tal R's painting style is described as "kolbojnik", which means "left-overs", a Hebrew word for "jack-of-all-trades."

He has shown work in exhibitions including Bicycle Thieves at Beret International Gallery in Chicago, House of Prince at Douglas Hyde Gallery in Dublin, The Gallery Show at the Royal Academy of Art in London and Ars Fennica at Henna and Pertti Niemisto Art Foundation in Helsinki.

Tal R currently teaches at the Kunstakademie Düsseldorf.

2019 legal action

In 2019, two Faroese artists bought one of Tal R's paintings, Paris Chic, and announced plans to cut it up and use pieces of the canvas as decorative faces for a line of luxury wristwatches.  Tal R launched a successful action at the Maritime and Commercial Court of Denmark to stop the artists from destroying the work.

Notes

External links
Tal R at the Saatchi Gallery
Tal R on Daniel Richter - Daniel Richter on Tal R. Video interview by Louisiana Channel. 
Tal R: The moon above Copenhagen. Video interview by Louisiana Channel.

Danish contemporary artists
Danish painters
Jewish Danish artists
Israeli painters
Israeli contemporary artists
Academic staff of Kunstakademie Düsseldorf
Recipients of the Eckersberg Medal
Royal Danish Academy of Fine Arts alumni
Artists from Copenhagen
1967 births
Living people